The Eysturoyartunnilin (in English the Eysturoy Tunnel, earlier known as the Skálafjarðartunnilin) is a large  undersea road tunnel under the Tangafjørður sound in the Faroe Islands, connecting the island of Streymoy to the island of Eysturoy. It also crosses the southern part of Skálafjørður, and connects the towns of Runavík on the eastern side and Strendur on the western side of the fjord, and includes the world's first undersea roundabout in the middle of the network.  

It is the largest ever infrastructure project in the Faroe Islands. Construction costs are estimated to be around a billion DKK.[7] The roundabout features artwork, including large sculptures and light effects. The tunnel opened for traffic on 19 December 2020.

History 
The idea for the Eysturoyartunnilin emerged during the construction of the Vágatunnilin and Norðoyatunnilin, opened in 2002 and 2006 respectively, which heralded a new look on domestic transport and regional development. In 2006, the private company P/F Skálafjarðartunnilin was founded to build this tunnel. Due to the financial crisis, it took the stakeholders several years to materialize the plans and get political support. The tunnel was included in the 2012 national mobility plan, which abandoned the name Skálafjarðartunnilin and thereafter exclusively named it Eysturoyartunnilin. In June 2013, another private company, P/F Eysturoyartunnilin, was established in order to pursue a deal between the Faroese national government, the Faroese insurance company LÍV and the Danish-owned Copenhagen Infrastructure Partners (CIP). CIP made secret arrangements with the Faroese minister for transport, Kári P. Højgaard, who had to resign in early September as this came out. This led to a small political crisis. In 2015, after the outcomes of an official inquiry, the cabinet of Kaj Leo Johannesen had to call for early elections. Both P/F Skálafjarðartunnilin and P/F Eysturoyartunnilin were liquidated in 2015, after circa two years of inactivity. Meanwhile, in the aftermath of the political crisis of 2013, a special commission drafted a proposal for a public rather than private solution. This proposal was supported by all parties and led in 2014 to the establishment of a public company, P/F Eystur- og Sandoyartunlar (in short 'EStunlar' or EST). This company, owned entirely by the Ministry of Transport, builds, owns and manages both the Eysturoyartunnil and the Sandoyartunnil. NCC was contracted to carry out the construction works for both tunnels.   

The financial coupling (cross subsidization) between the two tunnels is necessary since the Sandoyartunnilin is not expected to generate sufficient ridership to recover its own investment via its own tolls alone, while the Eysturoyartunnilin is expected to have surplus capacity. As a result, the tolls for the Eysturoyartunnilin will not decrease as traffic numbers increase (price inelasticity). Only when the construction investments for both tunnels has been sufficiently been earned back, tolls could sink. This differs from the Vága- and Norðoyatunnilin where tolls dropped gradually with time. Another difference is that the Eysturoyartunnilin does not replace a ferry route, so tolls cannot be compared to ferry ticket prices.

Further reading 
 Theme about the Eysturoy tunnel by the National Broadcasting Service of the Faroe Islands: http://kvf.fo/tema/skalafjardartunnilin
 Documentary by KVF: Skálafjarðartunnilin - kosta hvat tað kosta vil

Construction 
On 8 November 2016, a deal was struck with the Scandinavian construction company NCC to construct the Eysturoy tunnel as well as the Sandoy tunnel. The contract for both tunnels is for 2,073 million DKK, whilst the overall cost for both tunnels is estimated at around 2,600 million DKK.

The drilling of the tunnel itself started on 21 February from the Strendur side and on 27 April 2017 from the Hvítanes side. The Strendur team reached the underwater roundabout section on 4 December 2017, at which point 3,059 metres had been dug from both sides combined. With the first leg and roundabout completed, a third drilling team started, with two teams on the Hvítanes-roundabout leg working towards each other (which met underwater on 7 June 2019) and one from the roundabout to Saltnes. The last blast was shot on 7 June 2019, after which a number of months was used for tarmacking, cabling, installing emergency facilities and signposting. Meanwhile, NCC moved the drillsets to the Sandoyartunnilin, which started on 27 June 2019.

While the expected opening date was 1 December 2020, due to technical delays and COVID-19 this was postponed to 19 December 2020.

Specifications 

The tunnel is a two-laned undersea tunnel that has three tubes which meet at an underwater roundabout, 72.6 metres below the surface of the Skálafjørður fjord. The tunnel is 2,153 metres long from the entrance at Rókini in Saltnes to the roundabout, and the distance from Sjógv at Strendur to the roundabout is 1,625 metres. The main branch from Tórshavn to the roundabout measures 7,460 metres and resurfaces by the village of Hvítanes. This results in an overall road length of 11.238 kilometres, making it currently the 2nd-longest sub-sea road tunnel in the world, surpassed only by the Ryfast tunnel at Stavanger in Norway. The roundabout is the world's first sub-sea roundabout.

Art in the tunnel 
The roundabout is fitted with metal artwork by the Faroese artist Tróndur Patursson, as well as lighting effects.  The artwork is an  piece which he custom-made for the tunnel, featuring a combination of human silhouettes and light effects. The metal plates will be allowed to oxidise and change colour. The Norðoyatunnilin, which opened in 2006, also includes some of Patursson's light art. Each tunnel portal features a sequence of freestanding concrete and lit arches, as landmarks.

The opening 
The opening of the tunnel for general traffic was on 19 December 2020, which was 18 years and 9 days after the opening of the first subsea tunnel in the Faroe Islands, the Vágatunnilin connecting Tórshavn with Vágar Airport. For the Eysturoyartunnilin there was a ceremony with speeches and music before the tunnel opened, which was broadcast live by the Faroese Television KVF. Emergency response vehicles had been allowed to use the tunnel a few months before opening.

Impact 
When the tunnel opened in December 2020, it significantly reduced travel times to the capital. The tunnel shortened the travel distance from Tórshavn to Runavík/Strendur from 55 kilometres (34 miles) to 17 kilometres (11 miles). The 64-minute drive is cut down to 16 minutes. The drive from Tórshavn to Klaksvík was reduced from 68 minutes to 36 minutes. Similar to the impacts of the two existing sub-sea tunnels, an intensification of traffic, interaction and regional integration is expected to result from the increased accessibility, on both the local, regional and national scale. On the Eysturoy side of the tunnel house prices increased by 31% between 2019 and 2020 and have doubled between 2015 and 2020.

Strandfaraskip Landsins changed its bus route network in response to the tunnel's opening, but was pressed by the public along the route to restore the old network after a few months. This means that the trunk route 400 connecting Klaksvík to Tórshavn remains taking the old, 30 minute longer route via Sundalagið. A rush hour express service (route 401) between Klaksvík and Tórshavn was inserted that uses the Eysturoyartunnilin, as well as a much more frequent 'Tunnel route' (route 450) between Tórshavn, Strendur and Toftir/Runavík, whence route 440 connects to villages along the Skálafjørður fjord. This means that passengers between Tórshavn and Klaksvík can opt for either a transfer-free longer route (route 400), or save circa 30 minutes by taking either the express route (rush hours on working days) or a double-transfer trip (routes 450 Tórshavn-Runavík, 440 Runavík-Søldarfjørður and 400 Søldarfjørður-Klaksvík). 

The national government and Runavik municipality agreed on the construction of a bypass between the tunnel mouth and the town limits of Glyvrar, in order to alleviate the increasing traffic through the town streets once the tunnel has opened. This road, named Fjøruvegurin (foreshore road), is going to be built on the shoreline. The budget for a new express way between Hvítanes and Tórshavn, Innkomuvegurin, was agreed on by the national government and Tórshavn Municipality in June 2021. The road will include a short tunnel and is to be ready in 2025.

Tolls and traffic numbers 
In December 2020 the toll prices were announced by the agency Tunnil. For cars with a toll registration (hald), the initials tolls (10 January 2021) on the section Streymoy-Eysturoy ranged from 175 DKK for a small car (up to ) and 150 DKK for vans to 400 DKK for lorries and 1250 DKK for large buses (19 seats or more). For local traffic between Saltnes and Strendur, the fees were 25, 50, 100 and 750 DKK, respectively. Tolls are levied for travel in both directions, unlike the Vágatunnilin and Norðoyatunnilin, which charge tolls only one way. Tunnil claims that the saved travel time, fuel and wear compensates for the increased travel costs on the main routes between Tórshavn, Southern Eysturoy and the Northern Isles. The financial compensation for commuters (ferðastuðul) was extended to include a compensation of 8.45 DKK per leg for the Eysturoyartunnilin tolls. 

The projected traffic numbers were 6,000 for 2022, of which 5,100 between Eysturoy and Streymoy and 900 between both sides of the Skálafjørður. The tunnel would generate 3,600 new daily crossings. However, apart from the opening day (14,700 vehicles in twelve hours) and the toll-free introduction month that ended on 10 January 2021 (average daily ridership 7,500 vehicles), traffic numbers dropped steeply. The first week (which included night-time closures for maintenance) saw 3,151 vehicles per day, the second week 3,647 vehicles per day and the third week 3,764 vehicles per day. In July the ridership was 4,500 vehicles. These numbers include all directions on both Streymoy-Eysturoy and Saltnes-Strendur itineraries. 

All in all, the lower-than-expected ridership raises questions about the financial outlook for both the Eysturoyar- and Sandoyartunnilin. Public pressure is mounting to reduce the fees in order to raise ridership. Opponents of the high tolls claim to prefer the old, longer route. Along this route through the Sundalagið, a traffic count in the Norðskálatunnilin suggests circa 900 cars remain using the old route.

See also 
 List of tunnels in the Faroe Islands
 Vágatunnilin
 Norðoyatunnilin
 Sandoyartunnilin
 Suðuroyartunnilin
 Skálafjørður

References

External links 
 P/F Eysturoyar- og Sandoyartunlar
Tunnil

Buildings and structures in the Faroe Islands
Tunnels completed in 2020
Tunnels in the Faroe Islands
Undersea tunnels in Europe
2020 establishments in the Faroe Islands